Parachloritis is a genus of air-breathing land snails, terrestrial pulmonate gastropod mollusks in the subfamily Hadrinae of the family Camaenidae.

Species
 Parachloritis afranio Köhler & Kessner, 2014
 Parachloritis argilacea (Férussac, 1821)
 Parachloritis atauroensis Köhler & Kessner, 2014
 Parachloritis baucauensis Köhler & Kessner, 2014
 Parachloritis herculea Köhler & Kessner, 2014
 Parachloritis laritame Köhler & Kessner, 2014
 Parachloritis malukuensis Köhler & Kessner, 2014
 Parachloritis manuelmendesi Köhler & Kessner, 2014
 Parachloritis mariae (Nobre, 1917)
 Parachloritis mendax (Martens, 1864)
 Parachloritis mundiperdidi Köhler & Kessner, 2014
 Parachloritis newtoni (Nobre, 1917)
 Parachloritis ninokonisi Köhler & Kessner, 2014
 Parachloritis nusatenggarae Köhler & Kessner, 2014
 Parachloritis pseudolandouria Köhler & Kessner, 2014
 Parachloritis ramelau Köhler & Kessner, 2014
 Parachloritis reidi Köhler & Kessner, 2014
 Parachloritis renschi Köhler & Kessner, 2014
 Parachloritis sylvatica Köhler & Kessner, 2014
 Parachloritis telitecta (Möllendorff, 1892)

References

 Ehrmann, P. (1912). Die Landmollusken-Fauna der Tenimber-Inseln. Sitzungsberichte der Naturforschenden Gesellschaft zu Leipzig. 38: 32-71

External links

 Köhler, F.; Kessner, V. (2014). Mitochondrial and morphological differentiation in a previously unrecognized radiation of the land snail genus Parachloritis Ehrmann, 1912 on Timor (Pulmonata: Camaenidae). Contributions to Zoology. 83(1): 1-40

Camaenidae